The Murphy Ranch is a ranch built in Rustic Canyon, Los Angeles in the 1930s by Winona and Norman Stephens, who were sympathizers of the anti-semitic, white supremacist Silver Legion of America. The owner of record in 1933 was Jessie M. Murphy. Designed as a base for Nazi activities in the U.S., it was intended to be capable of being self-sustaining for long periods. The compound had a water storage tank, a fuel tank, a bomb shelter, and various outbuildings and bunkers. The estate's main gate was designed by Paul Williams, a well-known African-American architect in the Southern California area.

On Monday, December 8, 1941, the day after the Japanese attack on Pearl Harbor, local police occupied the compound and detained members of the 50-strong caretaker force.

As of 1990, it was abandoned and in a state of disrepair, and covered in graffiti. The site is currently owned by the city of Los Angeles. In early 2016, many of the ranch buildings were demolished, as they were deemed unsafe.  A few buildings remain, including the power house, an all-concrete building that once contained the diesel generators. All entryways have been sealed.

In popular culture 
The ruins of Murphy Ranch are featured in Richard Kadrey's "Sandman Slim"-series novel Killing Pretty.

The Murphy Ranch was the featured location of the radio play "Annexing the Palisades" written in 2020 by Alex Goldberg. The play is set in 1939 and is about the construction of the house and its Nazi ties.

Gallery

See also 
 Nazism in the United States

References

External links 
 Guided historical hikes to Murphy Ranch
 Photographic tour of the Murphy Ranch by Josh McNair
 What Really Happened at Rustic Canyon's Rumored Nazi Ranch?
 A description of the hiking route to Murphy Ranch and additional history by Casey Schreiner
 The New Yorker, September 25, 2017, "The Nazi Sites of Los Angeles", by Dana Goodyear

Fascism in the United States
Unused buildings in California
Ranches in California
Westside (Los Angeles County)
1930s establishments in California
Santa Monica Mountains